Arnold is a community of the Municipality of the District of Shelburne in the Canadian province of Nova Scotia.

Communities in Shelburne County, Nova Scotia